Jessica Alice Fostekew (born 5 July 1983) is an English actor and stand-up comedian.

Biography
Fostekew was born in Sheffield in 1983 and grew up in Langton Matravers, Dorset. She is of one-quarter Austrian ancestry. She earned an LL.B. from the London School of Economics.

Fostekew has written for Mock The Week, 8 Out of 10 Cats Does Countdown and The News Quiz. She has cohosted The Guilty Feminist. In 2019, her show "Hench" was nominated for the Main Award at the Edinburgh Comedy Awards. In 2019 she appeared on Live at the Apollo and The Museum of Curiosity and in 2020 appeared on QI.

In April 2022 Fostekew published an article in The Guardian criticising an election candidate for expressing opposition to the legality of same-sex marriage, arguing that this amounts to hate speech.

Fostekew is a keen weightlifter and has integrated her hobby into her act.

References

External links
 Official page
 
 

English women comedians
Living people
1983 births
People from Swanage
Alumni of the London School of Economics
English people of Austrian descent
21st-century English comedians